Branchial may refer to:

 Branchial apparatus, an embryological structure.
 Branchial arch a series of bony "loops" present in fish, which support the gills.
 Branchial artery, also known as aortic arches.
 Branchial cleft
 Branchial cleft cyst, failure of obliteration of the second branchial cleft in embryonic development.
 Branchial efferent, also known as special visceral efferent.
 Branchial heart
 Branchial membrane
 Branchial plexus
 Branchial pouches, also known as pharyngeal pouches.   
 First and second branchial arch syndrome, also known as hemifacial microsomia.  
 Ultimo-branchial bodies, also known as ultimopharyngeal body.